Eric II  may refer to:

Eric II of Denmark (c. 1090–1137) 
Eric II of Norway (1268–1299) 
Eric II, Duke of Schleswig (c. 1290–1325)
Eric II of Pomerania (between 1418 and 1425–1474)
Eric II, Duke of Mecklenburg (1483–1508)
Eric II, Duke of Calenberg (1528–1584)